The Somalian blind barb (Barbopsis devecchi) is a ray-finned fish species in the family Cyprinidae. It is the only member of the genus Barbopsis. This troglobitic fish is found only in Somalia.

There are two other cavefish species in Somalia: the cyprinid Phreatichthys andruzzii and the catfish Uegitglanis zammaranoi.

References

Barbs (fish)
Cave fish
Cyprinid fish of Africa
Fish of Somalia
Endemic fauna of Somalia
Fish described in 1926
Taxonomy articles created by Polbot
Taxobox binomials not recognized by IUCN